MechWarrior is a role-playing game set in the fictional BattleTech universe.

Description
MechWarrior is set in the fictional BattleTech universe in which players can assume the roles of MechWarriors (BattleMech pilots) or other individuals in the 31st century.

Publication history
There have been three editions and many expansions and adventures, the first of which was published in 1986 by FASA Corporation. In addition, numerous novels by such authors as Michael A. Stackpole flesh out the game's fictional world. There is also an animated series.

Editions 
All three editions were created by FASA Corporation authors. A second printing of the third edition of the game was published by FanPro, LLC (in November 2006). To reduce confusion between WizKids' MechWarrior: Dark Age games and the MechWarrior roleplaying game, FanPro renamed this reprint as Classic BattleTech RPG. The newest edition released by Catalyst Game Labs in the line of Total Warfare is A Time of War:
 MechWarrior: The BattleTech Role Playing Game (first edition: 1986)
 MechWarrior: Second Edition (second edition: 1991)
 MechWarrior: Third Edition (third edition: 1999)
 Classic BattleTech RPG (second printing of MechWarriors third edition: 2007)
 A Time of War''' (released in Dec 2010)

 Translations 

 Finnish 
The first edition of MechWarrior was translated into Finnish by Meyer Richards and Jaakko Mäntyjärvi for the Finnish publishing house Pro-Games, a successor of Protocol Productions. The game was published on 1991 under the title Mechwarrior: Battletech roolipeli.

 French 
The first edition of MechWarrior was translated into French by Michel Serrat for the French publishing house Hexagonal. Serrat's translation was published in 1989 under the title of Technoguerriers, which loosely translates the original English title.

 Japanese 
Fujimi Shobo published a translation of MechWarrior in 1993. It was supported by the scenario collection Tamar and four replays.

 Spanish 
In Spain the two first editions of the game were translated into Spanish and published: the first edition in 1990 by the nowadays defunct Diseños Orbitales publishing house and the second edition in 1994 by Ediciones Zinco, also defunct. Both publishing houses were from Barcelona.

Reception
Scott Tanner reviewed Mechwarrior in Space Gamer/Fantasy Gamer No. 78. Tanner commented that "I found this supplement very useful, for not only did it provide a roleplaying side to the game, but the background material was useful in setting up scenarios and the like."MechWarrior was ranked 49th in the 1996 reader poll of Arcane magazine to determine the 50 most popular roleplaying games of all time.  The UK magazine's editor Paul Pettengale commented: "Over the years since its original release, FASA has developed every aspect of the background and history of the Battle Tech setting. The result is a detailed universe overflowing with potential for adventure."

ReviewsWhite Wolf #7 (1987)Envoyer (German) (Issue 62 - Dec 2001)Jeux & Stratégie'' #58 (as "Les Technoguerriers")

See also 

 BattleTech

References 

BattleTech games
Jordan Weisman games
Mecha role-playing games
Role-playing games introduced in 1986